Vinayak Gupta (born 23 June 1999) is an Indian cricketer. In November 2019, he was named in India's squad for the 2019 ACC Emerging Teams Asia Cup in Bangladesh. He made his List A debut for India, against Bangladesh, in the Emerging Teams Cup on 16 November 2019.

References

External links
 

1999 births
Living people
Indian cricketers
Place of birth missing (living people)